Cannabis in Tanzania is illegal but remains the most common drug and it is produced for different usage, such as domestic usage and exporting. It is locally known as bangi. Tanzania is one among multiple countries in Africa that produce cannabis in large quantities.

Cultivation 
Cannabis in Tanzania is cultivated in coastal zone of Tanga, northern zone of Arusha, Manyara and Kilimanjaro, southern highland of Iringa and Lake Zone of Shinyanga and Mara Cannabis is mainly produced in rural areas. It takes four to five month for cannabis to mature. Cannabis is also imported from outside the country and the main entry is the airport of Dar es salaamTemplate:Citation needed, Kilimanjaro International airport (KIA) and the seaport of Dar es salaam and Zanzibar and small airports like Tanga and Mwanza.

Usage 
Cannabis is used for medicine in rural areas, used to cure ailment like ear-ache, fever and malaria. Cannabis leaves are used to make and prepare food in rural areas.

Enforcement 

The government destroyed some of the plantations and punished people who were cultivating it. In Tanzania selling, possessing and cultivating cannabis is an offense People who cultivate cannabis illegally claim that it is more profitable than other crops. People who are found with cannabis or using cannabis are caught and are arrested for five years with additional penalties.

See also
Cannabis by country
Cannabis sativa

References 

Tanzania
Drugs in Tanzania